Dóttir was a restaurant in Portland, Oregon's KEX Hotel, in the United States. The restaurant closed on January 1, 2022.

Description and history
Dóttir (Icelandic: "daughter") was a 3,500-square-foot restaurant on the ground floor of the KEX Hotel on Martin Luther King Jr. Boulevard. Described as having "Icelandic-Pacific-Northwestern" (Icelandic/Nordic and Pacific Northwest) cuisine, the restaurant opened in 2019. Ólafur Ágústsson and Alex Jackson served as culinary director and executive chef.

Dóttir began serving brunch in January 2020. After closing during the COVID-19 pandemic, the restaurant reopened in mid 2021 with Michael Zeman as chef. Dóttir closed on January 1, 2022.

See also

 List of defunct restaurants of the United States
 List of Pacific Northwest restaurants

References

2019 establishments in Oregon
2022 disestablishments in Oregon
Defunct European restaurants in Portland, Oregon
Defunct Pacific Northwest restaurants
Icelandic cuisine
Icelandic-American culture
Kerns, Portland, Oregon
Northeast Portland, Oregon
Restaurants disestablished during the COVID-19 pandemic
Restaurants disestablished in 2022
Restaurants established in 2019
Pacific Northwest restaurants in Oregon